The Joker Is Wild is a 1957 American musical drama film directed by Charles Vidor, starring Frank Sinatra, Mitzi Gaynor, Jeanne Crain, and Eddie Albert, and released by Paramount Pictures. The film is about Joe E. Lewis, the popular singer and comedian who was a major attraction in nightclubs from the 1920s to the early 1950s.

Plot
In 1929 Joe E. Lewis is a successful night-club singer in Chicago while working for the Mob during the Prohibition era. His decision to work elsewhere displeases his mob employer who has his thugs assault him by slashing his face and throat, preventing him from continuing his career as a singer.

After many years he eventually recovers and turns his acerbic and witty sense of humor into an act when given a break as a stand-up comedian from singer Sophie Tucker. Soon, Lewis makes a career for himself as a comic, but heavy drinking and a self-destructive behavior leads him to question what his life has become and how he has hurt the people around him including his wife Martha and his best friend Austin.

Cast
 Frank Sinatra as Joe E. Lewis
 Mitzi Gaynor as Martha Stewart
 Jeanne Crain as Letty Page
 Eddie Albert as Austin Mack
 Beverly Garland as Cassie Mack
 Jackie Coogan as Swifty Morgan
 Barry Kelley as Captain Hugh McCarthy
 Ted de Corsia as Georgie Parker
 Leonard Graves as Tim Coogan
 Valerie Allen as Flora, Chorine
 Hank Henry as Burlesque Comedian
 Sophie Tucker as herself

Production
Sinatra read Art Cohn's book The Joker Is Wild: The Story of Joe E. Lewis during the mid-'50s, was immediately taken by the story, and bought the rights to the book after Lewis himself turned down a reported $150,000 from Metro-Goldwyn-Mayer for the film rights to his story. Variety reported in November 1955 that Paramount Pictures would finance what was, for all intents and purposes, an independent feature film which was headed by Lewis and Sinatra along with director Charles Vidor and author Art Cohn. Each of the four partners were paid a reported $400,000, along with 75% of the film's net profits. The New York Times would report that Sinatra's share was in the region of $125,000 along with 25% of the film's profits.

The filming of the movie was done mostly later in the day, Sinatra preferring to work at that time and the filming schedule being tailored around this. Sinatra also insisted that all the musical scenes in the film and songs therein be recorded live on set to keep the performances more genuine. Frank Sinatra: "When I do a concert and someone coughs, I like that," Sinatra remarked. "I like the scraping of chairs. You get the feeling that it's really happening. I've always thought Lewis was one of only about four or five great artists in this century - one of them was Jolson - and I remember him screaming like the devil when he made a soundtrack." (from All the Way: A Biography of Frank Sinatra)

Critical reception
The Joker Is Wild opened to mostly favorable reviews.

Los Angeles Times reviewer Phillip K. Scheuer: "[Sinatra] catches the bitter inner restlessness almost too well...When Lewis, highball in hand, is reciting them [the drunk monologues] his natural clown's grin takes the curse off their cynicism; from Sinatra the gags come out bitter and barbed."

Films and Filming reviewer Gordon Gow: "One consolation in the glossy gloom of this downbeat drama is that Frank Sinatra has sufficient talent and taste to break through the wall of embarrassment that is bound to arise between an audience and the film case-history of an unanonymous alcoholic."

Variety commented on the "major job Sinatra does... alternately sympathetic and pathetic, funny and sad."

This movie won the 1957 Academy Award for Best Original Song, for "All the Way" by Jimmy Van Heusen and Sammy Cahn. When the film was re-released some years later, the title was changed for a period to All the Way due to the immense popularity of the film's theme song, which peaked at No. 2 in Billboard.

Sinatra actually became friends with the real Lewis, who commented that "You (Sinatra) had more fun playing my life than I had living it."

See also
 List of American films of 1957

References

External links
 
The Joker Is Wild review in Variety

1957 films
1950s biographical drama films
1950s musical drama films
American biographical drama films
American black-and-white films
American musical drama films
Films about alcoholism
Films directed by Charles Vidor
Films scored by Walter Scharf
Films set in Chicago
Films set in the 1920s
Films set in the 1930s
Films set in the 1940s
Films that won the Best Original Song Academy Award
Paramount Pictures films
Films based on biographies
Films based on works by American writers
1957 drama films
Biographical films about entertainers
1950s English-language films
1950s American films